Heliophanus aberdarensis is a jumping spider species in the genus Heliophanus.  It was first described by Wanda Wesołowska in 1986 and is found in Kenya and South Africa.

References

Spiders described in 1986
Fauna of Kenya
Fauna of South Africa
Salticidae
Spiders of Africa
Taxa named by Wanda Wesołowska